William Liath de Burgh (died 1324) was an Irish noble and deputy Justiciar of Ireland (1308–09).

Background

De Burgh was a son of William Og de Burgh, who was killed at the Battle of Áth-an-Chip or Athankip in 1270, and a nephew of Walter de Burgh, 1st Earl of Ulster (died 1271). He was nicknamed liath, Gaelic for grey, though the reasons are unknown.

Career

De Burgh spent much of his life fighting on behalf of his cousin, the 2nd Earl of Ulster, first coming to notice in 1290 when he was defeated in a skirmish with Mac Coughlan.

He was deputy justiciar from 1 October 1308 under Piers Gaveston, relinquishing office on 15 May 1309.

The Bruce Invasion of Ireland

He was captured at the Battle of Connor in Ulster in 1315, when an army led by his cousin the Earl of Ulster was defeated by an Irish-Scots army led by Edward Bruce. He was sent to Scotland. His release was only been obtained by the Earl in the summer of 1316 in exchange for his son, Edmund, as hostage.

Athenry

Returning from Scotland he was in Connacht by July 1316 and assembled "a motley army of Anglo-Norman colonists and Irish chieftains who had remained loyal to the earl and marched against Fedlimid O'Connor, who had taken advantage of the chaos to lay waste to the province. On 10 August, after a particularly bloody battle at Athenry, William was victorious".

Family

He had married Finola Ni Briain, daughter of Brian Ruad or The MacJordan, by whom he had three sons:

 Sir Edmond Albanach de Burgh (died 1375)
 John Burgh, (1350–1398) Chancellor of the University of Cambridge
 Sir Ulick de Burgh (died 1352)
 * Sir Walter Liath de Burgh, died February 1332

He may also have had other children- legitimate or illegitimate:
 Raymond, ancestor of the Mac Raymond Burkes of Muinter Murchadha
 Richard, ancestor of the Clan Henry, Mac Walter of Lackagh, Mac William Duinn, Mac Tibbot and Mac Meyler
 Theobald, died 1336
 Thomas
 Gylle de Burgh (fl. 1332)
 Mor, married Ruaidhri O Cellaigh who died 1339
 Two unnamed sons, killed in Leinster in 1311

Summation

Ronan Mackay summed him up as a loyal and capable lieutenant of the Earl. "From 1305 onwards he was lord of connacht in all but name, allowing Richard to concentrate on the rest of his sprawling domains. The fact that Connacht did not collapse during the Bruce invasion was primarily due to William's ability and his strong ties to many of the leading Irish families of the province. Ironically his success in building a local power base there was to lead to conflict between his heirs and the next earl of Ulster.

He died in 1323 and was interred in the Dominican priory at Athenry. He is the ancestor of the Bourkes of County Mayo.

Annalistic references

From the Annals of the Four Masters:

 M1322.11. William Liath Burke, son of William More, died.
 M1324.3. William Burke, son of William More, died.

Genealogy

   Walter de Burgh
   |
   |
   |                                           |
   |                                           |
  William de Burgh, died 1205.    Hubert de Burgh, 1st Earl of Kent, d. 1243.
   |                                        (issue; John and Hubert)
   |_
   |                                                         |                                             |
   |                                                         |                                             |
  Richard Mór de Burgh, 1st Baron of Connaught Hubert de Burgh, Bishop of Limerick, d. 1250.   Richard Óge de Burgh
   |                                                                                                       |
   |                                           |
  de Burgh Earl of Ulster,                     |                  |               |
  Burke of Castleconnell, County Limerick      |                  |               |
  Mac William Iochtar Bourke of County Mayo.  Hubert William Richard
                                               |                  |               |
                                               |                  |               |_
                                      Clan Mac Hubert?   Richard an Fhorbhair     |                |
                                                                  |               |                |
   ___|               Sir David Donn Sir William Ruad
   |                                           |         |                            |                    d.1327.
   |                                           |         |                   Clan Mac David
   Ulick Burke of Annaghkeen, d. 1343.      Raymond Walter Óge
   |
   |
   Richard Óg Burke, d. 1387.
   |
   |
   Burke of Clanricarde

Sources (Genealogy)

 A New History of Ireland, volume IX, Oxford, 1984;
 Earls of Ulster and Lords of Connacht, 1205–1460 (De Burgh, De Lacy and Mortimer), p. 170;
 Mac William Burkes: Mac William Iochtar (de Burgh), Lords of Lower Connacht and Viscounts of Mayo, 1332–1649, p. 171;
 ''Burke of Clanricard: Mac William Uachtar (de Burgh), Lords of Upper Connacht and Earls of Clanricard, 1332–1722.

References

Irish soldiers
Justiciars of Ireland
People from County Mayo
People from County Galway
Norman warriors
14th-century Irish politicians
1324 deaths
William Liath
Year of birth unknown